José Laureano (born 1972-11-06) is a retired professional boxer from Puerto Rico. As an amateur, he represented his native country in the light flyweight division (– 48 kg), winning a silver medal at the 1993 Central American and Caribbean Games in Ponce, Puerto Rico. Rated as a bantamweight he made his professional debut on 1994-02-26, defeating compatriot Rafael Colón in Guaynabo, Puerto Rico. He quit after 34 pro bouts (18 wins, 15 losses and 1 draw).

References 
 

1972 births
Living people
Bantamweight boxers
Boxers at the 1995 Pan American Games
People from Vega Baja, Puerto Rico
Puerto Rican male boxers
Central American and Caribbean Games silver medalists for Puerto Rico
Competitors at the 1993 Central American and Caribbean Games
Central American and Caribbean Games medalists in boxing
Pan American Games competitors for Puerto Rico
20th-century Puerto Rican people